Prikubansky District is the name of several districts in Russia.

Districts of the federal subjects

Prikubansky District, Karachay-Cherkess Republic, an administrative and municipal district of the Karachay-Cherkess Republic

City divisions
Prikubansky Okrug, an okrug of the city of Krasnodar, the administrative center of Krasnodar Krai

See also
Prikubansky (disambiguation)

References